Mchenga conophoros is a species of fish in the family Cichlidae. It is endemic to Lake Malawi, where it has been collected around the Nankumba Peninsula in Malawi. Its natural habitat is freshwater lakes.

References

conophoros
Fish of Lake Malawi
Fish of Malawi
Fish described in 1993
Taxonomy articles created by Polbot